On the nasal surface of the body of the maxilla, in front of the opening of the sinus is a deep groove, the lacrimal groove (or lacrimal sulcus), which is converted into the nasolacrimal canal, by the lacrimal bone and inferior nasal concha; this canal opens into the inferior meatus of the nose and transmits the nasolacrimal duct.

Additional images

References 

Bones of the head and neck